Robinson's Hole is the strait in Massachusetts' Elizabeth Islands separating Naushon Island from Pasque Island. It is one of four straits allowing maritime passage between Buzzards Bay and the Vineyard Sound. The others are Canapitsit Channel, Quick's Hole and Woods Hole.
Robinson's Hole is located in the town of Gosnold.

References

Straits of Massachusetts
Gosnold, Massachusetts
Bodies of water of Dukes County, Massachusetts